Royal Malaysia Police unit Police Volunteer Reserve (PVR) (Malay: Sukarelawan Polis) is a team of special police as well as the supporting element to the full-time Royal Malaysian Police force where normal citizens could volunteer to help to maintain peace and security of their respective formation. The PVR is mainly composed of professionals such as the architects, engineers, lawyers, teachers, doctors, businessmen and senior government officers. Under the National Blue Ocean Strategies, in 2017 PVR is targeted to have 50,000 people from all walks of like .

A police volunteer reserve officer when performing police duties shall have the same powers and duties and the same protection and immunities and shall be subject to the same authority and discipline as a regular police officer of corresponding rank. This means PVR have identical powers to their regular (full-time) colleagues including to carry and use of firearm, conduct search and arrest while on duty.

History

The PVR is created as a formation under the police authorities since the year 1957 which is known as Special Operations Volunteer Force. Currently, the personnel is amounted to as many as 5,000 officers from other states with focus on major towns. The philosophy of the PVR existence is to give opportunity to civilians to transform themselves into police careers. The PVR personnel perform the same kind of duties as regular police officers, in enforcing the law and maintaining peace and security in their respective formation.

Qualification of PVR 
The police volunteer reserve applicants is expected to pass the same requirement like those who applying for a regular police officer position except that the age requirement is from 18 to 45 years old.
The aspiring police volunteer reserve needs to be a full-time employee of any corporate company, established association, and preferably employees serving in the government sector. The police volunteer reserve applicants need to get clearance from their employers before they decide to join the Royal Malaysia Police Volunteer Reserve Force. 
Malaysian citizen who is qualified are invited to be part of Royal Malaysian Police Volunteer Reserve Force from all states in Malaysia. Those who are interested can apply from Royal Malaysia Police website through Sistem Semakan Online (SSO).

Training
Standard police training will be conducted for 6 month at police contingent or one week continuous training at the nearby police academy (PULAPOL) and latter training at their respected district police station. A local training will be conducted regularly in their formation throughout their service. 
When undergoing continuous training, the Police Volunteer Reserve is entitled to receive salary and allowances based on as an regular police officer of equivalent rank.

Organisations of PVR 
Police Volunteer Reserve Commandant appointed in each contingent is responsible to the State Police Chief for the following: -

 General advice on all matters on recruitment, appointment, promotion, discipline and Police Volunteer  Reserve welfare;
 Supervision of training and general administration of Police Volunteer Reserve Force.

Officer-in Charge Police District (OCPD/PVR) are usually commanded by Gazetted Officer which is Deputy Superintendent of Police (DSP) Police Volunteer for district level. While police station level is commanded by Gazetted Officer which is Inspector of Police (INSP) Police Volunteer called as Officer-in Charge Police Station (OCS/PVR)
respectively. 
Police Volunteer Reserve are under the supervision of the Officer-in Charge Police District (OCPD) and Head of Department where they are stationed and duty at.

PVR officer and personnel when on duty shall be deemed junior in the ranks of their regular police officer counterparts. As an example: Deputy Superintendent of Police (DSP) Police Volunteer deemed junior to the same rank of DSP in regular police force, but it is higher ranking to Assistant Superintendent of Police (ASP), Inspector of Police (INSP) and other lower ranking officers of regular police, police volunteer reserve and auxiliary police. 
A Police Volunteer Reserve gazetted officer when on duty and in uniform, is entitled to receive a salute from lower ranks gazetted officer and personnel whether in regular police force, police volunteer reserve force and auxiliary police force as stated in IGSO A109 under Section 3.4 dan IGSO H601 under section 3.13.10.

Duties of PVR 

When a PVR officer and personnel were deployed for active duty they may be assigned to any task according to their training, experience, technical knowledge or expertise and physical strength that suits them. 
The duties undertaken by personnel of police volunteer reserve when not actively deployed as instruct by the Malaysian Inspector General of Police (IGP), is as follows:-

1.1 Beat (police) assignment;

1.2 Patrol; on Motorbike (RCJ & URB) / Mobile Patrol Vehicle (MPV);

1.3 Administrative;

1.4 Duties in the District Control Centre (DCC) or Contingent Control Centre (CCC);

1.5 Officer on Duty for Gazetted Police Officer (rank Inspector and above) at Contingent or District Level;

1.6 Transport duties (MT) or WT for Marine;

1.7 Enquiry Office (EO) Counter;

1.8 Traffic;

1.9 Crowd Control;

They are not usually assigned to: -

2.1 Investigate Criminal Cases;

2.2 Court Duty;

2.3 General Operations Force (GOF) Operations;

2.4 Anti Riot Unit (FRU);

2.5 Special Branch (SB);

2.6 Jury.

When deployed for active duty, the Police Volunteer Reserve is subject to the same power and disciplinary procedures as their regular police counterparts by the police: Conduct and Discipline, Junior Police Officers and Constables Regulations, 1970, and the Police Force Commission's Instrument of Delegation of Certain Functions, Powers, Duties and Responsibilities, 1976.

Absorbs of People's Volunteer Corps and Civil Defence Department members
In August 2009, the Malaysian People's Volunteer Corps (RELA) and Malaysian Civil Defence Department (JPAM) members will start their duty as Police Volunteer Reserve (PVR) to achieve the new government's one the six National Key Result Areas (NKRA) in the Key Performance Indicators (KPI) efforts to reduce street crime by 20% in the next 14 months.  The Home Minister, Dato' Seri Hishammuddin Hussein said 948 are RELA members and 174 others are from the Civil Defence Department were selected to join the team last month. Currently, the 135 maiden batch of volunteers from the RELA and JPAM will complete their two-week-long training today and are ready to start duties as volunteer police personnel from Sunday.

See also
 Suksis
 Volunteer Special Constabulary
 Sukarelawan Polis

References

External links
 Royal Malaysian Police Official Website
 Persatuan Sukarelawan Polis Malaysia
 Police Volunteer Reserve, Royal Malaysian Police Official Website
 Sukarelawan Polis Diraja Malaysia Kontinjen Selangor
 Sukarelawan Polis Ibu Pejabat Kontijen Kuala Lumpur
 Sukarelawan Polis Portal Polis Kontinjen Johor

Royal Malaysia Police
Reserve forces of Malaysia